Z. spinosa may refer to:
 Zilla spinosa, a short leaved plant species
 Ziziphus spinosa, a buckthorn species in the genus Ziziphus

See also
 Spinosa (disambiguation)